Abhayagiri may refer to:

 Abhayagiri vihāra a ruined monastic complex of great historical significance in Sri Lanka
 Abhayagiri Buddhist Monastery, a Theravadin Buddhist monastery in Redwood Valley, California